Franschhoek Pass is located in the Western Cape, Province of South Africa on the Regional road R45 (Western Cape) between Franschhoek and Villiersdorp.

The entrance to the Mont Rochelle Nature Reserve is located on this pass.

Be Aware

 Skill level: Novice (Caution - Conservative speed recommended)
 Road Condition: Tarred surface, tight turns, precipitous edge
 Remarks: Fast road frequented by fast superbikes and slow tourists. Beautiful views.
 Baboons, snakes and other wild life crossing.

References

Mountain passes of the Western Cape